Charles Beckwith may refer to:

 Charles Beckwith (athlete) (1901–1970), British Olympic athlete
 Charles Alvin Beckwith (1929–1994), U.S. Army officer
 Charles D. Beckwith (politician) (1838–1921), American congressman
 Charles D. Beckwith (photographer) (died 1891), American frontier photographer
 Charles Minnigerode Beckwith (1851–1928), bishop of the Episcopal Diocese of Alabama
 John Charles Beckwith (British Army officer) (1789–1862), known as Charles Beckwith, British soldier during the Napoleonic Wars